Eugene Kal Siskel (January 26, 1946 – February 20, 1999) was an American film critic and journalist for the Chicago Tribune. Along with colleague Roger Ebert, he hosted a series of movie review programs on television from 1975 until his death in 1999.

Siskel started writing for the Chicago Tribune in 1969, becoming its film critic soon after. In 1975, he was paired with Roger Ebert to co-host a monthly show called Opening Soon at a Theater Near You airing locally on PBS member station WTTW. In 1978, the show, renamed Sneak Previews, was expanded to weekly episodes and aired on PBS affiliates all around the United States. In 1982, Siskel and Ebert both left Sneak Previews to create the syndicated show At the Movies. Following a contract dispute with Tribune Entertainment in 1986, Siskel and Ebert signed with Buena Vista Television, creating Siskel & Ebert & the Movies (renamed Siskel & Ebert in 1987, and renamed again several times after Siskel's death).

Known for their biting wit, intense professional rivalry, heated arguments, and their trademark "Thumbs Up or Thumbs Down" movie ratings system, Siskel and Ebert became a sensation in American pop culture. Siskel remained in the public eye as Ebert's professional partner until Siskel's death on February 20, 1999, at age 53, from complications following his May 1998 brain surgery.

Early life 
Siskel was born in Chicago, and was the son of Ida (née Kalis) and Nathan William Siskel. His parents were Russian Jewish immigrants. Siskel lost both of his parents as a child and, as a result, was raised by his aunt and uncle, moving with them when he was nine years old. He attended Culver Academies and graduated from Yale University with a degree in philosophy in 1967, where he studied writing under Pulitzer Prize–winning author John Hersey. Hersey's reference assisted him in gaining a job at the Chicago Tribune in 1969.

Career

Writing 
Siskel's first print review, written one month before he became the Tribunes film critic, was for the film Rascal. His review of the film was not favorable ("Because of the excessive gimmicky, most kids will miss the tenderness," he wrote). Prior to this he served in the US Army Reserve; he was a military journalist and public affairs officer for the Defense Information School. For a time afterwards, he was acquainted with Playboy magazine publisher, Hugh Hefner.

In 1986, the Chicago Tribune announced that Siskel was no longer the paper's film critic, and that his position with the paper had been shifted from that of a full-time film critic to that of a freelance contract writer who was to write about the film industry for the Sunday paper and also provide capsule film reviews for the paper's entertainment sections. The demotion occurred after Siskel and Ebert decided to shift production of their weekly movie-review show, then known as At the Movies (later known as Siskel & Ebert), from Tribune Entertainment to The Walt Disney Company's Buena Vista Television unit. Editor James Squires stated on the move, "He's done a great job for us. It's a question of how much a person can do physically. We think you need to be a newspaper person first, and Gene Siskel always tried to do that. But there comes a point when a career is so big that you can't do that." Siskel declined to comment on the new arrangement, but Ebert publicly criticized Siskel's Tribune bosses for punishing Siskel for taking their television program to a company other than Tribune Entertainment. Siskel remained in that freelance position until his death in 1999. He was replaced as film critic by Dave Kehr.

The last review published by Siskel for the Chicago Tribune was for the film She's All That, published on January 29, 1999, in which he gave a favorable review, giving it three stars out of four and wrote that "Rachael Leigh Cook as Laney, the plain Jane object of the makeover, is forced to demonstrate the biggest emotional range as a character, and she is equal to the assignment. I look forward to seeing her in her next movie."

Siskel & Ebert 

In 1975, Siskel teamed up with Ebert, film reviewer for the Chicago Sun-Times, to host a show on local Chicago PBS station WTTW which eventually became Sneak Previews. Their "thumbs-up, thumbs-down" system soon became an easily recognizable trademark, popular enough to be parodied on comedy shows such as Second City Television, In Living Color, Bizarre, and in movies such as Hollywood Shuffle and Godzilla. Sneak Previews gained a nationwide audience in 1977 when WTTW offered it as a series to the PBS program system.

Siskel and Ebert left WTTW and PBS in 1982 for syndication. Their new show, At the Movies, was produced and distributed by Tribune Broadcasting, the parent company of the Chicago Tribune and WGN-TV. Sneak Previews continued on PBS for 14 more years with other hosts until its cancellation in 1996. In 1986, Siskel and Ebert left Tribune Broadcasting to have their show produced by the syndication arm of The Walt Disney Company. The new incarnation of the show was originally titled Siskel & Ebert & the Movies, but later shortened to Siskel & Ebert. At the Movies also continued for a few more years with other hosts until its cancellation in 1990.

The last five movies Siskel reviewed with Ebert on the show before his death aired during the weekend of January 23–24, 1999. On the show, they reviewed At First Sight, Another Day in Paradise, The Hi-Lo Country, Playing by Heart, and The Theory of Flight. Siskel gave thumbs up to all of them, except for Playing by Heart.

Following Siskel's death, Ebert continued the series with rotating guest hosts, which included Martin Scorsese, Janet Maslin, Peter Bogdanovich, Todd McCarthy, Lisa Schwarzbaum, Kenneth Turan. Elvis Mitchell, and the eventual replacement for Siskel, Richard Roeper.

Film and TV appearances 
Siskel and Ebert were known for their many appearances on late-night talk shows, including appearances on The Late Show with David Letterman sixteen times and The Tonight Show Starring Johnny Carson fifteen times. They also appeared together on The Oprah Winfrey Show, The Arsenio Hall Show, Howard Stern, The Tonight Show with Jay Leno, and Late Night with Conan O'Brien.

In 1982, 1983, and 1985, Siskel, along with Ebert, appeared as themselves on Saturday Night Live. For their first two appearances, they reviewed sketches from that night's telecast and review sketches from the "SNL Film Festival" for their last appearance.

In 1991, Siskel, along with Ebert, appeared in a segment on the children's television series Sesame Street entitled "Sneak Peak Previews" (a parody of Sneak Previews). In the segment, the critics instruct the hosts Oscar the Grouch and Telly Monster on how their thumbs up/thumbs down rating system works. Oscar asks if there could be a thumbs sideways ratings, and goads the two men into an argument about whether or not that would be acceptable, as Ebert likes the idea, but Siskel does not. The two were also seen that same year in the show's celebrity version of "Monster in the Mirror".

In 1993, Siskel appeared as himself in an episode of The Larry Sanders Show entitled "Off Camera". Entertainment Weekly chose his performance as one of the great scenes in that year's television.

In 1995, Siskel and Ebert guest-starred on an episode of the animated TV series The Critic entitled "Siskel & Ebert & Jay & Alice". In the episode, Siskel and Ebert split and each wants protagonist Jay Sherman, a fellow movie critic, as his new partner. The episode is a parody of the film Sleepless in Seattle.

A very early appearance of Siskel, taken from Opening Soon at a Theater Near You, the predecessor to Sneak Previews, is included in the 2009 documentary film, For the Love of Movies: The Story of American Film Criticism. In the film, he is seen debating with Ebert over the merits of the film version of One Flew Over the Cuckoo's Nest.

Critical style 
Gene Siskel had an abrasive review style, and claimed his film criticism was an individual exercise that should not be swayed by public taste. In an interview for The Academy of Television and Radio, his TV co-host said of him, "I think Gene felt that he had to like the whole picture to give it a thumbs up."

In particular, he often gave negative reviews to films that became box office champs and went on to be considered mainstream classics: Poltergeist, Scarface, Beverly Hills Cop, The Terminator, Aliens, Predator, Indiana Jones and the Last Crusade, Thelma & Louise, and Independence Day. This even extended to several films that went on to win the Oscar for Best Picture: The Silence of the Lambs and Unforgiven.

Yet, Ebert also noted in a memoriam episode of Siskel and Ebert that when Siskel found a movie that he truly treasured, he embraced it as something special. Directly addressing his late colleague, Ebert said: "I know for sure that seeing a truly great movie made you so happy that you'd tell me a week later your spirits were still high." Some of Siskel's most treasured movies included My Dinner with Andre (1981), Shoah (1985), Fargo (1996), and the documentary Hoop Dreams (1994).

Preferences

Favorites 
One of Siskel's favorite films was Saturday Night Fever; he even bought the famous white disco suit that John Travolta wore in the film from a charity auction. Another all-time favorite was Dr. Strangelove. A favorite from childhood was Dumbo, which he often mentioned as the first film that had an influence on him.

Best films of the year 
Siskel compiled "best of the year" film lists from 1969 to 1998, which helped to provide an overview of his critical preferences. His top choices were:

 1969: Z
 1970: My Night at Maud's
 1971: Claire's Knee
 1972: The Godfather
 1973: The Emigrants
 1974: Day for Night
 1975: Nashville
 1976: All the President's Men
 1977: Annie Hall
 1978: Straight Time

 1979: Hair
 1980: Raging Bull
 1981: Ragtime
 1982: Moonlighting
 1983: The Right Stuff
 1984: Once Upon a Time in America
 1985: Shoah
 1986: Hannah and Her Sisters
 1987: The Last Emperor
 1988: The Last Temptation of Christ

 1989: Do the Right Thing
 1990: Goodfellas
 1991: Hearts of Darkness: A Filmmaker's Apocalypse
 1992: One False Move
 1993: Schindler's List
 1994: Hoop Dreams
 1995: Crumb
 1996: Fargo
 1997: The Ice Storm
 1998: Babe: Pig in the City

From 1969 until his death in February 1999, he and Ebert were in agreement on nine annual top selections: Z, The Godfather, Nashville, The Right Stuff, Do the Right Thing, Goodfellas, Schindler's List, Hoop Dreams, and Fargo. There would have been a tenth, but Ebert declined to rank the -hour documentary Shoah as 1985's best film because he felt it was inappropriate to compare it to the rest of the year's candidates. Six times, Siskel's number one choice did not appear on Ebert's top ten list at all: Straight Time, Ragtime, Once Upon a Time in America, The Last Temptation of Christ, Hearts of Darkness, and The Ice Storm. Six times, Ebert's top selection did not appear on Siskel's; these films were 3 Women, An Unmarried Woman, Apocalypse Now, Sophie's Choice, Mississippi Burning, and Dark City.

Personal life 
In 1980, Siskel married Marlene Iglitzen, who was then a producer for CBS in New York. They had two daughters, Kate and Callie, and a son, Will. Their daughters graduated from Siskel's alma mater, Yale University.

Brain surgery and death 
Siskel was diagnosed with a malignant brain tumor on May 8, 1998. He underwent brain surgery three days later. For a few weeks after the surgery he did the Siskel & Ebert show on the telephone (from his hospital bed) while Ebert was in the studio. Siskel eventually returned to the studio after his recovery, but was noted to appear more lethargic and mellow than usual. On February 3, 1999, he announced that he was taking a leave of absence from the show, but that he expected to be back by the fall, stating, "I'm in a hurry to get well because I don't want Roger to get more screen time than I."
Siskel died on February 20, 1999, from complications of his brain surgery, and his funeral was held two days later at the North Suburban Synagogue Beth El. He is interred at Westlawn Cemetery in Norridge, Illinois.

Legacy 
Siskel was a Chicago sports fan, especially of his hometown basketball team, the Chicago Bulls, and would cover locker-room celebrations for WBBM-TV news broadcasts following Bulls championships in the 1990s.

Siskel was also a member of the advisory committee of the Film Center at the School of the Art Institute of Chicago, and a strong supporter of the Film Center mission. He wrote hundreds of articles applauding the Film Center's distinctive programming and lent the power of his position as a well-known film critic to urge public funding and audience support. In 2000, the Film Center was renamed The Gene Siskel Film Center in his honor.

Only once during his long association with Ebert did Siskel ever change his vote on a movie during the review. He initially gave the film Broken Arrow a "thumbs up", but after hearing Ebert's criticism, Siskel changed his mind to "thumbs down". However, he had changed his opinions on films years after his initial reviews, as with Tremors, which he gave a negative review to in 1990 but later gave a glowing positive review in 1994, stating, "I wasn't sure what I missed the first time around, but it just didn't click."

Siskel said that he walked out on three films during his professional career: the 1971 comedy The Million Dollar Duck starring Dean Jones, the 1980 horror film Maniac, and the 1996 Penelope Spheeris film Black Sheep. When he mentioned walking out on Black Sheep in 1996, he said it was the first time he walked out on a movie he was reviewing since Million Dollar Duck in 1971; he later explained that he did not include Maniac because he did not review Maniac as an assignment for his newspaper or part of his and Ebert's weekly TV reviews but only as a "Dog of the Week", a feature of the TV show in which each critic would single out the very worst movie they had seen that week.

Both critics had specific sensitivities and feelings that would often vary in extremes to certain kinds of bad films. Ebert was very sensitive to films about race and ethnicity; Siskel was sensitive to films about families and family relationships, and had a special hatred for films like House Arrest (1996) and Like Father Like Son (1987), both of which were about parents and their children.

Following Siskel's death in 1999, Ebert wrote:

Ebert once said of his relationship with Siskel:

When both men appeared together on The Late Show Starring Joan Rivers, Joan Rivers conducted a "together and separately" interview with them, which at one point had each men wear Walkman-style headphones, playing loud music, while the other commented on his partner. When asked what he thought was the biggest difference between himself and Ebert, Siskel unhesitatingly replied: "I'm a better reviewer than he is", but a few moments later, he said that anyone who read an Ebert review would read "an extremely well-written review".

At the 1999 Academy Awards ceremony, after its in memoriam montage of deceased stars and film contributors (which did not include Siskel), host Whoopi Goldberg gave a brief impromptu tribute to Siskel:

She included the iconic "thumbs-up" gesture; it received a great round of audience applause.

Filmography
{| class="wikitable sortable"
|-
! Year
! Title
! Role
! Notes
|-
| 1975-1982 || Sneak Previews || Host || 148 episodes
|-
| 1982-1985 || Saturday Night Live || Himself || 3 episodes
|-
| 1982-1986 || At the Movies || Host || 156 episodes
|-
| 1982-1993 || Late Night with David Letterman || Guest || 15 episodes
|-
| 1983-1995 || ABC News Nightline || Himself || 3 episodes
|-
| 1985-1992 || The Tonight Show Starring Johnny Carson || Guest || 15 episodes
|-
|rowspan="3"| 1986 || The Late Show || Himself || 1 episode
|-
| Nightlife || Himself || 1 episode
|-
| Hour Magazine || Himself || 1 episode
|-
| 1986-1999 || At the Movies || Host || 597 episodes
|-
| 1987 || Rated K: For Kids by Kids || Guest || Episode: "Gene Siskel and Roger Ebert"
|-
| 1987-1993 || Siskel & Ebert Holiday Gift Guide || Host || 7 episodes
|-
| 1988 || 48 Hours || Film Critic || Episode: "In Hollywood"
|-
| 1988-1996 || The Oprah Winfrey Show || Movie Critic || 3 episodes
|-
| 1989 || The Siskel & Ebert 500th Anniversary Special || Host ||
|-
| 1989-1993 || The Arsenio Hall Show || Himself || 3 episodes
|-
|rowspan="2"| 1990 || Siskel & Ebert: The Future of the Movies || Host ||
|-
| Moving Pictures || Himself || 1 episode
|-
|rowspan="6"| 1991 || Big Bird's Birthday or Let Me Eat Cake || Himself ||
|-
| Sesame Street: Monster in the Mirror || Himself ||
|-
| The Howard Stern Show || Himself || Episode: "Siskel & Ebert"
|-
| The Best of Disney: 50 Years of Magic || Himself ||
|-
| Siskel & Ebert: Actors on Acting || Himself ||
|-
| A Comedy Salute to Michael Jordan || Himself ||
|-
|rowspan="3"| 1992 || Sesame Street || Himself || Episode: "An African Lullaby by Lillian"
|-
| Diamonds on the Silver Screen || Himself ||
|-
| Hoffa: Siskel and Ebert || Himself ||
|-
| 1992-1998 || The Tonight Show with Jay Leno || Guest || 11 episodes
|-
|rowspan="3"| 1993 || Bob Hope: The First 90 Years || Himself ||
|-
| Sesame Street Jam: A Musical Celebration || Himself ||
|-
| The Larry Sanders Show || Himself || Episode: "Off Camera"
|-
|rowspan="4"| 1994 || Bill Nye the Science Guy || Himself || Episode: "Eyeballs"
|-
| Investigative Reports || Media Critic || Episode: "Prime Time Violence"
|-
| The 31st Annual Publicist Guild of America Awards || Himself ||
|-
| The 10th TV Academy Hall of Fame || Himself || 
|-
| 1995 || The Critic || Himself || Episode: "Siskel & Ebert & Jay & Alice"
|-
| 1995-1997 || Howard Stern || Himself || 3 episodes
|-
|rowspan="3'| 1996 || Biography || Himself || Episode: "Arnold Schwarzenegger: Flex Appeal"
|-
| 60 Minutes || Movie Critic || Episode: "Easy Money in Hard Times/The Mormons/Spike Lee"
|-
| The Siskel & Ebert Interviews || Interviewee || 
|-
| 1997 || Late Night with Conan O'Brien || Guest || Episode: "Gene Siskel & Roger Ebert/Jeffrey Ross"
|-
|rowspan="4"| 1998 || The Sport Jerks || Himself ||
|-
| AFI's 100 Years...100 Movies: America's Greatest Movies || Himself ||
|-
| Chicago Filmmakers on the Chicago River || Himself ||
|-
| Chicago Tonight || Guest || Episode: "Gene Siskel and Roger Ebert"
|-
| 1999 || Television: The First Fifty Years || Interviewee ||
|}
Bibliography
 The Future of the Movies'' (1991), with Roger Ebert - collected interviews with Martin Scorsese, Steven Spielberg, and George Lucas about the future of motion pictures and film preservation. It is the only book co-authored by Siskel and Ebert.

See also 
List of people with brain tumors

References

External links 

 
 
 
 Gene Siskel: The Balcony is Closed Article on Legacy.com
 Gene Siskel's Top Ten List By Year (1969–1998)
 Bio on Biography.com
 
 

Gene Siskel
1946 births
1999 deaths
20th-century American male writers
20th-century American non-fiction writers
American film critics
American male non-fiction writers
American people of Russian-Jewish descent
Burials at Westlawn Cemetery
Chicago Tribune people
Culver Academies alumni
Deaths from brain cancer in the United States
Deaths from cancer in Illinois
Jewish American writers
Military personnel from Illinois
Television personalities from Chicago
Writers from Chicago
Yale University alumni
20th-century American Jews
Siskel and Ebert
United States Army reservists